The Aviaimpex KT-112 Yanhol ("Angel") is a light, three-seat helicopter produced by Aviaimpex in the Ukraine. It was first presented to the media on August 31, 2001.

Design and development
A three-seat prototype was first built in 2001, with its first flight planned for June 2002. The helicopter contains two  Rotax 912 ULS flat-four piston engines, pod-and-boom configuration, skid undercarriage, three-blade main rotor, and a two-blade tail rotor mounted on T-tail configuration. By May 2002, Aviaimpex had revealed plans for helicopter gunship and unmanned aerial vehicle versions. The Ukrainian Defence Ministry placed orders for 100 pilot training versions of this aircraft and the Ministry of the Interior ordered a number for patrol use. The Georgian government and the Moscow mayor's office also placed an order for this aircraft. A total of 400 "Angel"s have been ordered in the two-seat configuration.

In 2010, the project ceased to exist. Part of the engineering team, in 2017 created its own company "Aviation Company Vector" where it continued to work on a completely updated twin-engine helicopter VM-4 "Jmil".

Specifications 
 Dimensions
 Length: 
 Height: 
 Weights
 Empty: 
 Maximum take-off: 
 Maximum payload: 
 Main rotor
 Diameter: 
 Blades: 3 × 
 Tail rotor
 Diameter: 
 Blades: 2 × 
 Speeds
 Maximum speed: 
 Maximum cruising speed: 
 Maximum range:

References 

 Jane's All the World's Aircraft, 2004–2005.

External links 
 www.janes.com

2000s Ukrainian helicopters
Yanhol